A fedora is a type of hat.

Fedora may also refer to:

Arts, entertainment, and media
 Fedora (1913 film), an Italian silent film
 Fedora (1918 film), a film directed by Edward José
 Fedora (1926 film), a German silent film
 Fedora (1942 film), an Italian film starring Luisa Ferida and Amedeo Nazzari
 Fedora (1978 film), a film by Billy Wilder
 Fedora (opera), an 1898 opera by Umberto Giordano
 Fédora, an 1882 play by Victorien Sardou
 Fédora, one of writer Italo Calvino's fictional Invisible Cities
 Fedora Tchecoff, a character from Une mort suspecte, a short story by Pierre Boulle

Computing
 Fedora Linux, a Linux distribution
 Fedora Project, the development project for the operating system
 Fedora Commons, digital repository Java software by DuraSpace

People with the name
 Fedora (KGB agent), the codename for the Soviet Cold War double agent Aleksei Kulak
 Fedora Barbieri (1920–2003), Italian mezzo-soprano
 Larry Fedora (born 1962), American football coach

Places
 Fedorah, Alberta, a locality in Canada
 Fedora, South Dakota, United States

See also
 Trilby, a narrow-brimmed type of hat